Cara Black and Rennae Stubbs were the defending champions, but did not play together. Stubbs partnered with Lisa Raymond but lost in the first round to Stéphanie Cohen-Aloro and Selima Sfar.

Black competed with Liezel Huber and defeated Svetlana Kuznetsova and Amélie Mauresmo in the final, 6–2, 6–1 to win the ladies' doubles tennis title at the 2005 Wimbledon Championships.

Seeds

  Virginia Ruano Pascual /  Paola Suárez (withdrew)
  Cara Black /  Liezel Huber (champions)
  Lisa Raymond /  Rennae Stubbs (first round)
  Nadia Petrova /  Meghann Shaughnessy (quarterfinals)
  Elena Likhovtseva /  Vera Zvonareva (quarterfinals)
  Janette Husárová /  Conchita Martínez (third round)
  Daniela Hantuchová /  Ai Sugiyama (quarterfinals)
  Anna-Lena Grönefeld /  Martina Navratilova (semifinals)
  Anabel Medina Garrigues /  Dinara Safina (third round)
  Shinobu Asagoe /  Katarina Srebotnik (third round)
  Bryanne Stewart  /  Samantha Stosur (semifinals)
  Lindsay Davenport /  Corina Morariu (second round)
  Gisela Dulko /  María Vento-Kabchi (first round)
  Eleni Daniilidou /  Nicole Pratt (second round)
  Émilie Loit /  Barbora Strýcová (third round)
  Gabriela Navrátilová /  Michaela Paštiková (second round)
  Els Callens /  Emmanuelle Gagliardi (third round)

Virginia Ruano Pascual and Paola Suárez withdrew due to injury for Suárez. They were replaced in the draw by the highest-ranked non-seeded pair Els Callens and Emmanuelle Gagliardi, who became the #17 seeds.

Qualifying

Draw

Finals

Top half

Section 1

Section 2

Bottom half

Section 3

Section 4

References

External links

2005 Wimbledon Championships on WTAtennis.com
2005 Wimbledon Championships – Women's draws and results at the International Tennis Federation

Women's Doubles
Wimbledon Championship by year – Women's doubles
Wimbledon Championships
Wimbledon Championships